An unclimbed mountain is a mountain peak that has yet to be climbed to the top. Determining which unclimbed peak is highest is often a matter of controversy. In some parts of the world, surveying and mapping are still unreliable.  There are no comprehensive records of the routes of explorers, mountaineers, and local inhabitants. In some cases, even modern ascents by larger parties have been poorly documented and, with no universally recognized listing, the best that can be achieved in determining the world's highest unclimbed peaks is somewhat speculative. Most sources indicate that Gangkhar Puensum on the Bhutan–China border is the tallest mountain in the world that has yet to be fully summited. Gangkhar Puensum has been off limits to climbers since 1994 when Bhutan prohibited all mountaineering above  due to spiritual/religious beliefs.

Unclimbed mountains are sometimes referred to as "virgin peaks." Many virgin peaks exist because the mountain is unreachable, due to either geographic isolation or political instability. Some mountains remain off limits due to religious beliefs of a country or region that hold such mountains as sacred and should remain inviolate. Additionally, since the endeavor to scale taller mountains of the world is usually a major undertaking, lesser peaks, while still very formidable, simply get less attention than the taller ones, and instead these taller peaks are summited by parties following a new route or perhaps during the winter when conditions are generally more treacherous.

Challenges in definition

Definition of a mountain

Many mountains, in addition to their highest point or peak, will also have subsidiary subpeaks. Generally, the topographic prominence of a peak or subpeak, as well as the general topography, all come into consideration when determining whether such apexes are considered to be independent peaks or subpeaks. Although objective criteria have been proposed for distinguishing peaks from subpeaks, there is no widely agreed standard.

Verification of unclimbed status
It can be difficult sometimes to determine whether or not a mountain peak has been fully summited. Long before modern mountaineering commenced in the middle of the 19th century, evidence indicates that people did indeed travel up to the summits or near to the summits of major mountain peaks. In the Greater Himalaya region, Lhasa, in Tibet, sitting at  has been permanently occupied since the 7th century and many smaller settlements across the Greater Himalaya thrive at elevations exceeding . With humans living at high elevations for many millennia, nearby peaks to such settlements may or may not have been summited at some point in the past. However, many regions away from settlements may never have been explored, especially since some high peaks in the Greater Ranges are so remote that they were unknown to local inhabitants until they were sighted by explorers.

The world's third-tallest peak, Kangchenjunga, has been summited a number of times, but on the 1955 expedition the first climbers of the peak agreed to honor the wishes of locals and not set foot on the topmost part of the mountain. Succeeding mountaineering parties may (or may not) have followed this tradition. Similarly, Nanda Devi has also been climbed but the topmost summit was not ascended and the primary summit is now off limits to climbers. Machapuchare had only one summit attempt back in 1957 when climbers came within  of the summit; Nepal then banned future attempts.

Gangkhar Puensum

The mountain most widely claimed to be the highest unclimbed mountain in the world in terms of elevation is Gangkhar Puensum. It is in Bhutan, on or near the border with China. In Bhutan, the climbing of mountains higher than  has been prohibited since 1994. The rationale for this prohibition is based on local customs that consider this and similar peaks to be the sacred homes of protective deities and spirits, and the lack of high-altitude rescue resources from any locale closer than India. The prohibition was further expanded in 2003 when mountaineering of any kind was disallowed entirely within Bhutan. Gangkhar Puensum will likely remain unclimbed so long as the government of Bhutan prohibits it.

Highest unclimbed non-prohibited peak

It is unclear which is the highest unclimbed non-prohibited mountain. Based on the International Climbing and Mountaineering Federation's criteria, Muchu Chhish ( with a prominence of ) in Pakistan is currently the world's tallest that has not been climbed even though it is legal to do so.

Most prominent unclimbed peak
Unclimbed candidates with high topographic prominence are by definition independent mountains, but some have relatively modest elevations. With such peaks, there is a greater possibility of undocumented ascents, perhaps occurring long ago.

As of mid-2014 Sauyr Zhotasy (prominence of ), the highpoint in the Saur Range on the border between Kazakhstan and China, and Mount Siple (prominence of ) on Siple Island off the coast of Antarctica, have no record of successful ascents.  The unclimbed status of each of these peaks is difficult to confirm, although Mount Siple in particular is remote, uninhabited (and without any nearby habitation), and seldom visited. The most recent remaining most prominent mountain summited (with a prominence of ) was in June 2014 in the Finisterre Range of Papua New Guinea.

List of highest unclimbed peaks 

Mountains with prominence over 300 m in bold.

See also 
 List of mountain peaks by prominence
 List of highest mountains on Earth

Notes

References 

History of mountaineering
Highest things